Toni Bertorelli (18 March 1948 – 26 May 2017) was an Italian actor. He performed in over sixty films.

Biography
Bertorelli was born in Barge, Piedmont, Italy.

Bertorelli began his acting career in 1969 working with his friend Carlo Cecchi. He starred in early 1980s movies, but gained more popularity in the 1990s, starring in Mario Martone's Death of a Neapolitan Mathematician and Marco Tullio Giordana's Who Killed Pasolini?

During the 2000s, Bertorelli worked with directors like Nanni Moretti, Marco Bellocchio and Mel Gibson. In 2016, he played the role of Cardinal Caltanissetta in Paolo Sorrentino's short series The Young Pope.

Bertorelli died on 26 May 2017, at the age of 69, after a long illness.

Filmography

References

External links 
 

1948 births
2017 deaths
Italian male film actors
People from Barge, Piedmont